This is a list of people who have served as mayor or president of the city council of the city of Sarajevo, the capital of Bosnia and Herzegovina. Sarajevo has had 38 different mayors in 39 different mayorships since the position was created on 22 August 1878, upon Austro-Hungarian occupation.

History
The first mayor of Sarajevo Mustafa Fadilpašić was also the city's longest-served mayor, having remained in office for 14 years. The first non-Muslim mayor was Aristotel Petrović, who served from 1918 until 1920. The only mayor to serve more than once was Edhem Bičakčić, who was mayor from 1928 to 1929, and once again from 1935 to 1939. Fehim Čurčić, the city's fifth mayor, served during World War I. In 1941, Atih Hadžikadić was elected mayor, a position that was short-lived as he was hanged during World War II in August 1941. Semiha Borovac became Sarajevo's first female mayor in 2005.

The current, 39th mayor of the city is Benjamina Karić, serving since 8 April 2021.

Mayors

See also
History of Sarajevo
Timeline of Sarajevo

References

External links

Grad Sarajevo - Sarajevski gradonačelnici 1878–2013 

Mayors of places in Bosnia and Herzegovina

Mayors
Mayors
Lists of mayors